HMS E35 was a British E class submarine built by John Brown, Clydebank. She was launched on 20 May 1916 and commissioned on 14 July 1917. E35 sank  (one of the 1,512 ton U-boat cruisers originally designed as cargo carrying blockade runners) off the island of Madeira on 11 May 1918. This sinking was helped by British intelligence who had learned of a planned rendezvous between two U-boats off Cape St Vincent. E35 was sold in Newcastle on 6 September 1922.

Design
She was powered by two  Vickers eight-cylinder two-stroke diesel engines and two  electric motors.

E35 was armed with a 12-pounder  QF gun mounted forward of the conning tower. She had five 18 inch (450 mm) torpedo tubes, two in the bow, one either side amidships, and one in the stern; a total of 10 torpedoes were carried.

E-Class submarines had wireless systems with  power ratings; in some submarines, these were later upgraded to  systems by removing a midship torpedo tube. Their maximum design depth was  although in service some reached depths of below . Some submarines contained Fessenden oscillator systems.

Crew
Her complement was three officers and 28 men.

References

Bibliography
 

 

British E-class submarines of the Royal Navy
Ships built on the River Clyde
1916 ships
World War I submarines of the United Kingdom
Royal Navy ship names